USS Liberty may refer to:

, was an American Revolutionary War ship
, was a transport ship launched in June 1918 and decommissioned in May 1919, and as USAT Liberty, a United States Army transport ship sunk in 1942
, was a ship strafed and bombed by Israeli airforce in June 1967, resulting in more than 34 dead and 171 wounded and its decommissioning as beyond repair (USS Liberty incident is the main article concerning the attack).

Other
 , a patrol vessel in commission from 1917 to 1919

See also
 Liberty ship, World War II US merchant marine naval cargo ships

United States Navy ship names